ACM Queue is a bimonthly computer magazine founded and published by the Association for Computing Machinery (ACM). The magazine was established in 2003. Steve Bourne helped found the magazine when he was president of the ACM and is chair of the editorial board. The magazine is produced by computing professionals and is intended for computing professionals. It is available only in electronic form and is available on the Internet on subscription basis.  Some of the articles published in Queue are also included in ACM's monthly magazine, Communications of the ACM, in the Practitioner section.

References

External links
 

Computer magazines published in the United States
Bimonthly magazines published in the United States
Association for Computing Machinery magazines
Magazines established in 2003
Magazines published in New York City